Egoli Magic is a South African basketball club based in Johannesburg. The team was established in 1994 and currently plays in the Basketball National League. The team is the most successful ever in the BNL, as it has won a record five championships, in 2015, 2016, 2019, 2020 and 2021.

Honours
Basketball National League
Champions (5): 2015, 2016, 2019, 2020, 2021

Players

Individual awards
BNL MVP
Jose Salvador – 2015
Bandile Nsele – 2019
Miguel Ferrão – 2020
BNL Final MVP
Nkosinathi Sibanyoni – 2021

References

External links
Official Twitter
Official Facebook page

Basketball teams in South Africa
Basketball teams established in 1994
Sport in Johannesburg